Majkowice may refer to the following places:
Majkowice, Bochnia County in Lesser Poland Voivodeship (south Poland)
Majkowice, Proszowice County in Lesser Poland Voivodeship (south Poland)
Majkowice, Łódź Voivodeship (central Poland)